The Second C. A. Sawyer House is a historic house at 86 Waban Ave. in Newton, Massachusetts.  The -story brick building was designed by Derby and Robinson and built in 1919.  It is a well-executed example of Colonial Revival styling in brick, and demonstrates infill construction in established neighborhoods.  It is the second of three houses designed by Derby and Robinson for Charles Adrian Sawyer, a builder, and built between 1910 and 1926.

The house was listed on the National Register of Historic Places in 1990 as "C. A. Sawyer House (Second)".  The National Register incorrectly lists it at 221 Prince Street.

See also
 National Register of Historic Places listings in Newton, Massachusetts

References

Houses on the National Register of Historic Places in Newton, Massachusetts
Colonial Revival architecture in Massachusetts
Houses completed in 1919